The women's 60 metres event  at the 1989 IAAF World Indoor Championships was held at the Budapest Sportcsarnok in Budapest on 3 March.

Medalists

Results

Heats
The winner of each heat (Q) and next 7 fastest (q) qualified for the semifinals.

Semifinals
First 3 of each semifinal (Q) qualified directly for the final.

Final

References

60
60 metres at the World Athletics Indoor Championships